Company of Liars is a 2008 historical novel by Karen Maitland, set in the fourteenth century. The setting is a Britain which is being decimated by a pandemic known as the Plague.

This novel reached a large number of people in Britain due to the first few chapters being given away with The Daily Telegraph as a mini-paperback, in 2008.

Sources
 www.karenmaitland.com
 www.amazon.co.uk

Historical novels
2008 novels